Continue may refer to:
Continue (video gaming), an option to continue a video game after all the player's lives have been lost
Continue (keyword), a programming language keyword

Music
Continue (Pakho Chau album), 2008
Continue (Wax album)
...Continued, the second album released by Tony Joe White

See also
European Parliament Committee on Budgetary Control, abbreviated CONT
Continent (magazine), an online open access scholarly journal abbreviated as cont.
Continuity (disambiguation)
Continuation (disambiguation)